Mark Derek Rowing
(born March 24, 1966) is a former professional snooker player from Doncaster. A winner of the 1987 English Amateur title before turning pro, he reached a high end of season ranking of 57.

Career
He won the English Amateur title in 1987 defeating Sean Lanigan 13-11 in the final before turning professional. As a professional, Rowing reached a highest ranking of 57 in the world.

In April 1988 fellow pro Steve Duggan made a 148 in a practice frame against Rowing in Doncaster.

At the 1990 Mercantile Credit Classic Rowing reached the last 16 after defeating Dean Reynolds 5-4, and Barry West 5-0, before losing to eventual winner Silvino Francisco. At the 1990 British Open, Rowing defeated former world champions Fred Davis and Ray Reardon before losing to Les Dodd in the round of 32.  At the 1991 Grand Prix, Rowing led world champion Stephen Hendry 4-2 before eventually losing 5–4 in the round of 64. At the 1996 International Open Rowing defeated Doug Mountjoy and Tony Knowles before losing to Tony Drago in the round of 32.

Rowing won the 2009 EASB English Seniors Snooker Championship title at Sheffield's English Institute of Sport, defeating Phil Hartley in the quarter-final, and Colin Norton 6-4 in the final. Rowing reached the semi final of the 2010 European Senior Masters  losing 5–4 to Joe Delaney.

Personal life
Married Allison Rowing 22.8.21

Career finals

Amateur finals: 2 (2 titles)

References

Living people
1958 births
Sportspeople from Doncaster
English snooker players